The Women's 50 metre backstroke competition of the 2016 FINA World Swimming Championships (25 m) was held on 9 and 10 December 2016.

Records
Prior to the competition, the existing world and championship records were as follows.

Results

Heats
The heats were held at 09:44.

Semifinals
The semifinals were held at 19:43.

Semifinal 1

Semifinal 2

Final
The final was held at 19:38.

References

Women's 50 metre backstroke